Mad Money is an American finance television program hosted by Jim Cramer that began airing on CNBC on March 14, 2005. Its main focus is investment and speculation, particularly in public company stocks.

Cramer defines "mad money" as the money one "can use to invest in stocks ... not retirement money, which you want in 401K or an Individual retirement account, a savings account, bonds, or the most conservative of dividend-paying stocks."

Mad Money replaced Dylan Ratigan's Bullseye for the 6 p.m. Eastern Time slot. On January 8, 2007, CNBC began airing reruns of the show at 11 p.m. Eastern Time, on Monday through Friday, and at 4 a.m. Eastern Time, on Saturdays.

In March 2012, the program became a part of what was formerly branded as NBC All Night in the nominal 3:07 a.m. ET/2:07 a.m. timeslot on weeknights, replacing week-delayed repeats of NBC's late night talk shows. In that form, only the video for the program was presented on a 16:9 screen with gray branded windowboxing and pillarboxing, with all enhanced business information, including the CNBC Ticker, removed. The continuing movement of morning local newscasts, and with it Early Today further into what is known as the graveyard slot eventually began to interfere with the airing of Mad Money in this late slot, especially if they aired at 4 a.m., and in the Eastern and Pacific time zones (meaning seven minutes would have to be cut-off Mad Money to fit in Early Today and a local newscast starting at 4:30 a.m.). On July 31, 2017, Early Today began to first record at 3:00 a.m. ET, and without any room on the schedule, the NBC version of Mad Money was discontinued on this date.

On August 4, 2014, Mad Money was first broadcast in full-screen 1080i HD, resulting in the removal of the sidebar that was seen on all of CNBC's other trading-day programming, until the sidebar itself was permanently removed altogether on October 13, 2014. The NBC presentation displayed the native widescreen HD picture, albeit with the CNBC Ticker space still filled in with gray windowboxing.

Program features

Opening
Cramer usually starts his shows saying this, or an alternative version of this phrase after opening credits: "Hey, I'm Cramer, welcome to Mad Money, welcome to Cramerica, some people want to make friends [at this point, Cramer adds an extra, original statement], I just want to make you money, because my job is not just to entertain you, but to educate and teach you, so call me at 1-800-743-CNBC or tweet me @jimcramer."

Show medium
Cramer is usually standing up with the fisheye lens Steadicam close to his face, while providing stock picks and investing advice. His voice inflection often changes from calm to shouting then back to a calm tone. Cramer also throws various objects around the set. Whenever one of his books is mentioned by a caller, he grabs the book, flashes it, and tosses it to the floor as a plug gag. In addition, he has a panel of oversized red buttons, which activate various sound effects. The online version of the show's sound board is available at cnbc.com.

He also has small, plastic bulls and bears which he has incorporated into his shows. After a large gain in the Dow Jones Industrial Average, Cramer, dressed as a chef, chopped off the heads of the bears with a knife and placed them into a pan with onions and tomatoes. He called it a "bear stir-fry" or a "bear souffle". On February 28, 2006, he put his toy bulls through various kitchen appliances. And on May 17, 2006, after a steep plunge of the Dow, Cramer cooked toy bulls through a rotisserie oven. The studio has also featured Cramer bobblehead dolls which utter phrases such as "Are You Ready Skee-Daddy?", callers can receive a free bobblehead upon request.

Also, Cramer has National Football League yellow penalty and red coach's challenge flags that he throws whenever he believes a company has behaved unethically (penalty) or when he questions a stock decision (coach's challenge), respectively. He will also throw the flag when a caller unethically uses the national television audience to promote a stock for self-interest. If a caller rambles on about a stock, Cramer will lie down on the floor of the set with a pillow and blanket and act as if he is going to sleep.

Other props used include a box of Uncle Ben's Rice with Chair of the Federal Reserve Ben Bernanke's picture, an audio version of Jim Cramer's Real Money, a Louisville Slugger baseball bat, and pink Mad Money pigs.

On the May 19, 2006, episode, Cramer had a monkey named Ka-ching make an appearance on the show. Ka-ching wore a CNBC T-shirt, sat in Cramer's chair, pressed the buttons that made sound effects, and threw the foam bulls around the set.

In October 2006, a customized Daktronics BB-2122 scoreboard was installed, featuring drawings of bulls on the left and bears on the right. The scoreboard usually displays a score from the previous night's sporting events, usually a high-profile game (e.g. Monday Night Football, or a score from a general NFL, MLB, game). The scoreboard also shows the date, but in the discontinued Sudden Death segment, the date would turn into a countdown clock to the end of the segment. The scoreboard was not used during "Back to School" road shows.

In June 2011, the Mad Money set's original glass panels (with the word "MAD" painted on them) were replaced with video walls.

On April 23, 2013, the show introduced the second-generation Mad Money set, which replaced a variation of the original set that had been used since the show's 2005 debut.

On July 18, 2022, Mad Money relocated to the New York Stock Exchange, where an entirely new set debuted.

Segments
The general format of the show starts with two segments, where Cramer recommends one or more stocks in a group with his rationale for choosing them. At the end of each segment, Cramer will take one or two calls from viewers with questions about either the stock he recommended, or another stock in the same industry or which the viewer thinks may benefit from the topic discussed.

The third segment is the "Lightning Round". Segments four and five will feature either one of the segments listed below or another recommendation. Cramer does not take calls on these later segments except for the "Am I Diversified?" segment.

Mad Money regularly includes the following segments:
 Lightning Round  See below.
 Game Plan  A Friday segment in which Cramer draws up his game plan to prepare you for the week ahead. He lays out all the plays you will need to make Mad Money when the bell rings on Monday morning.
 Sell Block  A Thursday segment in which Cramer puts the stocks he recommended in past shows in the "Sell Block". From stocks that are lost causes or moneymakers, Cramer tells the viewers when it's time to pocket the proceeds and put those stocks in the "Sell Block".
 Am I Diversified?  A Wednesday segment in which Cramer reviews five stocks in each caller's portfolio and suggests how they might consider enhancing their diversification. This is the only segment, as a rule, where Cramer is sitting in the chair.
 Mad Mail  Cramer answers viewer emails.

The other segments featured on Mad Money (some of which are no longer current) include the following:
 Sudden Death  Seen at the end of most shows, this Booyah-free zone gives viewers one last chance to name their stock and get Cramer's feedback. But this rapid-fire Q&A ends when the clock reaches zero and the show's over. Launched by the phrase, "There goes swifty!", this segment is very similar to the "Lightning Round". Cramer will hang up on callers who attempt Booyahs, pleasantries, and the like. This segment was discontinued in 2009.
 Pick of the Week  A segment in which Cramer picks a stock which he feels should be bought or at least studied carefully, usually before it is widely known or praised by others.
 Beating the Racket  An occasional feature where Cramer argues "nose to nose" with fellow financial columnist Herb Greenberg (in person or via satellite) in which Greenberg focuses mainly on stocks that could lose money, usually a stock Cramer recommended. This segment has been discontinued.
 Cramer vs Cramer  A segment in which Cramer checks the accuracy of his stock predictions from previous weeks. Seen on Fridays.
 Danger Zone  An occasional feature in which Cramer profiles a stock that he feels does not have sound investment fundamentals but may appear attractive to investors.
 The Week That Was  A video montage featuring various moments from the current week, aired at the end of the program in place of the "Sudden Death" segment on Fridays.
 Pimpin' All Over The World  A segment (not actually using this title, but Cramer will reference the song by Ludacris of the same name) where Cramer profiles a potential play in an international market. Usually the play is not a direct investment – Cramer considers many of those to be too dangerous due to lack of accurate financial insight, especially in emerging stock markets – but a derivative, often another foreign company with ADR's traded on the American markets with significant investments in the emerging market, though in some cases Cramer will advise against the ADR's (if they trade on the pink sheets, which Cramer believes do not have significant volume to generate profits) and recommend actually buying the stock in the foreign exchange.
 Stump the Cramer  A segment in which callers name a stock they believe Cramer does not know anything about; if successful, the caller receives an autographed copy of one of his most recent books. This segment has been discontinued.
 Mad Cow Disease  Cramer pretends he is suffering from mad cow disease. While mimicking a mad cow he presses the show's sound buttons with his head.
 Am I Nuts?  A feature which premiered on the first "Main Event" special in which Cramer "evaluates a patient" (from the live audience) to figure out, just as the segment's namesake, if the person is nuts in owning a certain stock, and then gives them a "prescription". This segment is considered to be a "Main Event" exclusive.
 Know Your IPO  An occasional segment in which Cramer spotlights a stock's upcoming IPO.
 Executive Decision  In this segment, Cramer talks to the CEO, CFO, or an officer of a company, who joins the show either by telephone, on set or via satellite. In a variation of the segment, Cramer donned a cow bell and counted down to the market close. At close he would ring his cow bell by shaking left and right and then select a random stock to be "executed."
 Pin Action  This segment may stand alone or is integrated within the show amongst his recommended picks. In this segment, Cramer explains how he has come up with a "play" to take advantage of news from other stocks as a sort of "pin action" play. Often when explaining his theory, he uses the sound effect of a bowling ball knocking down pins.
 Under the Radar  Cramer crawls under the middle desk on set and pretends he is not present. The cameraman has to dramatically search the room but does not get to find Cramer. It's because he is under the radar.
 Student Stock Pitch  A feature in which college students (from the live audience) pitch a stock to Cramer. This segment is considered to be a "Back to School" exclusive.

Subtitles
Subtitles are frequently used to underscore some of the "bullet points" in Cramer's presentations. They are also used to explain some of the off-topic, obscure historical, literary, or pop-cultural references he may make. Subtitles are also used for disclosure stocks owned by Cramer's charitable trust, ActionAlertsPlus.com, for disclaimers related to any claims made by callers (such as how listening to Mad Money has made the caller mad money), and to show callers' names.

Lightning Round
The only segment which appears on every Mad Money show is the "Lightning Round" segment, where viewers call in (on live shows, they stand before a microphone in the audience) and ask Cramer about a specific stock.

Cramer's object is to showcase his encyclopedic knowledge of stocks and give callers a second opinion on their stock ideas. He takes as many calls as possible before a buzzer goes off to indicate the end of the round. When this happens, Cramer gets upset and usually takes a few more calls. After this, the Daktronics buzzer goes off at his signal, and the segment is over.

In the past, prior to beginning of the segment, Cramer would abuse the office chair provided for him by throwing it on top of other "victims" (damaged office chairs), also damaging the studio's wall and glass displays as well. The damage was made apparent by a caller in the "Lightning Round" on March 1, 2006, which prompted Cramer to throw his chair again at the glass display, causing it to crack even more. Cramer has said that the reason why he throws chairs is because he hates sitting down on the job. He often had to be at his old hedge fund by 4:30 a.m., and if his employees sat down they would often try to go to sleep, so chairs became "the enemy".

The segment usually airs between 25 and 30 minutes past the hour for approximately 8 minutes. Additionally, a new "Overtime" session debuted at the end of "The Lightning Round" on the March 2, 2006, episode. In conjunction with the buzzer going off, a siren was heard, the "On Air" light flashed repeatedly, and the monitors around the set had Cramer rotating infinitely with lightning and siren images merged into the background, that latter also displayed on the viewer's TV screen at random intervals. Cramer took 5 more calls after this. However, the "Overtime" session was discontinued, starting with the "Mad Money 1st Anniversary" show on March 14, 2006. The newer "Sudden Death" segment at the end of the show used any time remaining at the end of the show for an even more rapid "Overtime"-like session. That too, was discontinued in February 2008.

On February 25, 2008, Cramer introduced a Web-only version of the "Lightning Round", dubbed "Lightning Round Overtime". This feature had additional stock picks that were not seen on the television broadcast. "Lightning Round Overtime" was viewed only on the program's Website (high-speed Internet connection required). "Lightning Round Overtime" was eliminated July 2011.

Catchphrases 

On May 24, 2005, a viewer asked Cramer by e-mail on Mad Money's "Mad Mail" segment what his boo-yah! catchphrase means, and he said did not have a clue. On the next day, viewers e-mailed him claiming that Cramer's boo-yah! catch phrase is similar to the Booyah registered trademark of the Booyah Bait Company or to the phrase of SportsCenter's Stuart Scott, but Cramer answered that his phrase is not copied from that company nor from Stuart Scott, and means "Are you ready to make some money?"

On the August 19, 2005, episode of Late Night with Conan O'Brien, Cramer explained the origin of boo-yah: "Here's what happened: A guy calls me on my radio show, and he says 'You made me a 100 smackers on K-Mart – a hundred points...' – he's from New Orleans – '...and we have one word for that down here and it's boo-yah. Then the next guy calls and he says 'you know you made me a lot of money on [a stock] so: boo-yah!' And now they all say it. It's not my rap".

Another featured catchphrase is "Are you ready, skee-daddy?" Another commonality is for a caller to ask "Hows momma doin'?" to which Cramer replies "Momma doin' fine."

In June 2005, a viewer explained to Cramer by e-mail the difference between a pig and a hog, which is a domesticated pig, so Cramer changed one of his catch phrases to "Bulls make money. Bears make money. Hogs get slaughtered."

Graphics 
On May 2, 2007, the program unveiled its second-generation on-air graphics package, replacing what was used – including its opening graphic sequence – since its March 14, 2005, debut. In the previous graphics package, the program's lower third changed its background color from red to yellow on November 26, 2007.

On April 23, 2013 - the same day the program's second-generation set was introduced - Mad Money unveiled a new, cleaner-looking, on-air graphics presentation, replacing a variation of what had been used since May 2, 2007. The program's lower third background color is now white, just like all of the other CNBC business-day programs at the time. Also, 2 new sound-button animations were introduced, and they featured photos of bulls and bears with the words "BULL" and "BEAR" at the bottom of their respective photos. They replaced the old cartoon-like bulls and bears that had been used since the "1st Anniversary Show" on March 14, 2006.

As part of CNBC's network-wide switch to a 16:9 widescreen format on October 13, 2014, the on-air graphics were reformatted for the 16:9 presentation.

To coincide with the program's move to the NYSE on July 18, 2022, new on-air graphics debuted for the first time in 9 years.  The program's lower third is now a variant of CNBC's graphics package used since October 2014, with Gotham now used as the dominant font just like all of CNBC's other business-day programming.  The program's logo changed as well.

Disclaimer 
Jim Cramer has been quoted as saying that Mad Money "is a show that is about education, entertainment and making money". The show features a disclaimer at the start of the program to that effect.

Special broadcasts
Mad Money has featured special broadcasts, the first four in 2005 and 2006, respectively, were referred to as "Mad Money Main Event", while the 2006–present shows (other than the July 12, 2006, edition, which was also referred to as "Mad Money Main Event") was referred to as "Mad Money Back to School".

Main events
The first "Mad Money Main Event" was broadcast on July 20, 2005. Cramer had his show taped in front of a live studio audience of about 150 guests. The show was promoted on CNBC using commercials that showed Cramer locked up in a padded room in a straitjacket and tape over his mouth, as if in a mental institution (a reference to Cramer's book, the subtitle of which is "Sane Investing in an Insane World"). The "Main Event" was introduced by boxing announcer Michael Buffer with his catch phrase "Let's get ready to rumble!". The featured guest on the show was then-New York Attorney General Eliot Spitzer (a classmate of Cramer at Harvard Law School). Cramer went into the crowd and gave high fives to audience members who claimed to have had made money by following his stock tips. True to the commercials, it featured a segment titled "Am I Nuts?", which had audience members asking Cramer about their stocks. Mad Money was expanded to a special 90 minute edition for this occasion.

"Mad Money Main Event II" premiered on October 26, 2005. In the commercials, Cramer is now a surgeon instead of a patient, who performs surgery on the crippling economy (in this case, from the aftermath of Hurricane Katrina, yet there were other factors). While "operating", Cramer proclaims "The bull's alive!" signifying that he was successful. It featured special guest Donald Trump. It ran for only 60 minutes and brought back "Am I Nuts?" from the first "Main Event"; this has been the trend for future shows.

"Mad Money Main Event III" was broadcast on November 30, 2005, and featured Mel Karmazin, CEO of Sirius Satellite Radio (now Sirius XM Satellite Radio). Cramer entered the studio as a surgeon.

"Mad Money Main Event IV" premiered on January 11, 2006, with guest Les Moonves, CEO of CBS. This episode featured Cramer coming out in the straitjacket.

The fifth "Mad Money Main Event" show was broadcast on July 12, 2006. Like the second and third "Main Event" shows, Cramer entered the studio as a surgeon. His featured guest in the fifth edition was Jeff Zucker, CEO of NBC Universal.

"Mad Money Ladies' Night" was broadcast on January 22, 2008, and featured an all-female studio audience. This show also brought back the rarely seen "Am I Nuts?" segment. Unlike all of the prior "Main Event" and "Back to School" shows that aired, there was no featured guest.

On each of the Main Events thus far, significant stock market activity has coincidentally occurred (e.g. Google reaching a price of 350, which Cramer had predicted, and the Dow Jones Industrial Average attaining a 4-year high.)

Back to School (2006)

The first "Mad Money Back to School" event was broadcast on February 1, 2006, from Harvard University, Cramer's alma mater. Cramer's special guest was then-New York Attorney General and future New York State Governor Eliot Spitzer, who was a classmate of Cramer's at Harvard Law School.

The second "Back to School" broadcast originated from the University of Michigan on April 25, 2006.

Originally, the Wharton School of the University of Pennsylvania was Cramer's second stop on the tour with an air date of March 29, 2006, but this visit was canceled due to "logistics." Cramer's special guest on the second "Back to School" broadcast was Dave Brandon, CEO of Domino's Pizza.

The third "Back to School" broadcast originated from Columbia University in New York City on May 16, 2006, again promoted by the aforementioned "Britney" commercials. In that episode, a female audience member assisted Jim in throwing a beach chair at the start of the Lightning Round. Cramer's special guests were George David, CEO of United Technologies, and Raymond Milchovich, CEO of Foster Wheeler.

The fourth "Back to School" edition was broadcast from Boston College on September 20, 2006. Cramer's special guest on the fourth "Back to School" show was Tim Russert, and his son, Luke Russert, who was a student at Boston College.

The fifth "Back to School" edition was broadcast from Georgetown University in Washington, D.C. on September 29, 2006, the final stop for the 2006 leg of the "Mad Money Back to School" college tour. Cramer's special guest was NBC News chief White House correspondent David Gregory.

Back to School (2007)
The "Mad Money Back to School" college tour resumed on February 7, 2007. The first stop in the 2007 leg of the tour was at the Darden Graduate School of Business Administration at the University of Virginia. Cramer's special guest was Celgene President and Chief Operating Officer (COO), Robert J. Hugin.

The second stop in this leg was on March 20, 2007, at the McCombs School of Business at the University of Texas, Austin. Cramer's special guest was William R. Johnson, President, Chairman, and CEO of Heinz.

The third stop in this leg was on April 4, 2007, at the Kelley School of Business at Indiana University. The show was actually broadcast from the school's basketball arena, Assembly Hall. Cramer's special guest on the eighth edition was Mark Cuban, owner of the NBA's Dallas Mavericks and a 1981 Indiana University graduate.

The fourth stop in this year's tour was on September 7, 2007, at the Marshall School of Business at USC. Cramer's special guest on the ninth "Back to School" edition was Bob Iger, president and CEO of The Walt Disney Company.

The fifth stop in this year's tour took place on October 18, 2007, at the Georgia Institute of Technology College of Management located in Atlanta. It was originally scheduled to take place on April 24, 2007, but was postponed and rescheduled, due to the on-campus shooting deaths at Virginia Tech in Blacksburg, Virginia on April 16, 2007. Cramer's special guest on the tenth edition was E. Neville Isdell, CEO of The Coca-Cola Company. Incidentally, Cramer's interview with Isdell was filmed on location at that company's headquarters in Atlanta. This is the first Mad Money to be filmed outdoors and was filmed in the center atrium of the Management Building in the new Tech Square section of the campus. Georgia Tech was the final stop for the 2007 leg of the "Back to School" college tour.

Back to School (2008)
The "Back to School" college tour resumed on March 26, 2008, at the Smeal College of Business at Penn State University. This was the first stop on the 2008 leg of the college tour and the 11th "Back to School" broadcast overall.

The 12th "Back to School" show aired on November 12, 2008, at the University of Iowa. This was also the second and final stop of the college tour for the year.

Back to School (2009)
On Earth Day, April 22, Jim resumed the "Back to School" college tour at Ohio State University Fisher College of Business in Columbus, Ohio. Jim's special guest was Toll Brothers Chairman and CEO Robert I. Toll, who joined the show via satellite remote.

The "Mad Money Back to School" tour was at the University of Oklahoma on October 30, 2009. Jim's special guests were the late Chesapeake Energy CEO Aubrey McClendon (on set) and Devon Energy Chairman and CEO J. Larry Nichols. This program also covered that day's 250-point plunge on the Dow.

Back to School (2013)
On April 25, 2013, the 15th "Back to School" edition – and the 1st since October 30, 2009 – originated from Villanova University in Philadelphia.

Others
 "1st Anniversary Special": On March 14, 2006, the 1st Mad Money Anniversary show occurred. The episode was a mix of answering stock questions with many clips from previous episodes. The anniversary special also introduced two new sound button animations, replacing the original bull and bear animations with more animated, cartoon-like bulls and bears, but retaining the green and red backgrounds. (Green means up, and red means down on a ticker.) Also, during the "Lightning Round", when callers made mention of the book (Jim Cramer's Real Money: Sane Investing in an Insane World), they were greeted by 4 dancing girls holding large cardboard cutouts of the front cover.
 "2nd Anniversary Special": On March 14, 2007, the 2nd Mad Money Anniversary show occurred. The episode looked at highlights from the show's sophomore year, including clips of guests Cramer has interviewed on the show.
 "500th episode": The 500th episode of Mad Money aired on June 11, 2007. The episode featured memorable clips from some of the first 499 episodes, as well as a mix of call-ins and stock questions.
 "Mad Money: It's a Family Affair": The first of the special Father's Day episodes of Mad Money aired on June 14, 2007. "Mad Money: It's a Family Affair", features children (10 years and older) and parents in the studio audience. Ken Cramer (Jim's father) made a special guest appearance on that first "Mad Money: It's a Family Affair" show in 2007. This special show is aired annually on the Friday before Father's Day.
 "3rd Anniversary Special": The 3rd Mad Money Anniversary show aired on March 14, 2008. This episode was taped in front of a live studio audience (just like the previous "Main Event" and "Back to School" shows) and featured memorable clips from the first 3 years of the show. The rarely seen "Am I Nuts?" segment also returned.
 "Mad Money at the Half": These special half-hour editions of Mad Money were aired live at 1:30 p.m. ET during the 2008 Summer Olympics over two weeks, from August 11, 2008, to August 22, 2008. Due to CNBC's Olympics coverage, Fast Money Now (1pm ET) and Mad Money at the Half (1:30pm ET) were both seen in place of the second hour of Power Lunch, while original episodes of Fast Money and Mad Money were shown in the 9pm ET and 11pm ET timeslots, respectively.
 "1,000th episode": The 1,000th episode of Mad Money aired on April 8, 2009. This episode was taped in front of a live studio audience (just like in the "Main Event" & "Back to School" shows). Andy Reid, head coach of the Philadelphia Eagles, made a surprise appearance as he joined the show by phone during the "Lightning Round".
 "5th Anniversary Special": On March 15, 2010, the 5th Anniversary show was broadcast from Studio 8H at 30 Rockefeller Plaza (NBC Studios) in New York and featured a live studio audience, similar to the "Back to School" shows. Cramer's guest was Brian Williams, anchor of the NBC Nightly News.
 "2,000th episode": The 2,000th episode of Mad Money aired on October 1, 2013. This episode was taped outside the New York Stock Exchange Building in front of a live audience. Cramer was presented with a replica of the Ford Fairmont.
 "MMX": A special episode to celebrate the show's 10th anniversary was taped in front of a live audience and aired on March 12, 2015. This was also the first special episode of Mad Money to be broadcast in full-screen 1080i high-definition.

Production
Mad Money was recorded in CNBC's headquarters in Englewood Cliffs, New Jersey. On July 18, 2022, Mad Money's studio was moved to the New York Stock Exchange Building.  CNBC is a national cable television network owned by NBCUniversal and parent company Comcast.

The show is recorded occasionally with a live studio audience around 4 p.m. most weekdays for air that night, to be repeated occasionally when a live show is not viable. As the show is being ingested digitally in the Thomson SA Grass Valley MAN, the show is assembled by the editor and television producer to be made into the air product viewers watch Monday through Friday at 6 p.m. and 11 p.m. (ET). When difficulties arise, the show is occasionally "hot-rolled".

Among the many Mad Money contributors are executive producer Regina Gilgan; producer Kat Ricker; line producer, George Manessis; head writer Cliff Mason; tape producer Chris Schwarz, responsible for creating and delivering the final show to air. Stage Manager Kareem Bynes, camera operators Shaun Frullo, William Moore. Segment producers include Kate Welsh and Heather Butler, as well as assistant producers, Candy Cheng and Jackie Fabozzi, who compile elements needed for air, and help determine the show's editorial direction. Avid Adrenaline edited elements are created by CNBC Staff Avid Editors such as Darren Kotler, Conrad deVroeg, Nick Stantzos, and Steven Banton, and the show is constructed with CNBC Staff Grass Valley NewsEdit Editors Keri Conjura, Vanessa DiPietro, Julie Lajterman, Marc Telesca, Jared Kindestin, and Cosimo Camporeale.

Original music for Mad Money, including the "Lightning Round," was composed and performed by Willie Wilcox.

Mad Money was licensed for a brief fictional segment in the 2008 film version of Iron Man by Paramount Pictures and Marvel Studios. In the segment, shortly after Tony Stark (played by Robert Downey, Jr.) declares Stark Industries will no longer manufacture weapons, Jim Cramer is shown on Mad Money advising people in his trademark flair to sell off stock in Stark Industries.

Mad Money was also licensed for a brief fictional segment in the 2010 film Wall Street: Money Never Sleeps by 20th Century Fox. In the segment, Jacob Moore (played by Shia LaBeouf) spreads rumors about the nationalisation of an African oil field Hydra Offshore owned by Churchill Schwartz. Jim Cramer is shown on Mad Money advising people in his trademark flair to sell off stock in Hydra Offshore.

Reception
According to Nielsen Ratings, on July 7, 2008, the show had 228,000 viewers for its 6 PM airing and 133,000 viewers for its 11 PM rebroadcast. On March 9, 2009, the show had 328,000 viewers for 6 PM and 176,000 viewers for 11 PM.

In January 2006, Joseph Nocera, a business columnist at The New York Times, opined that the "people who are watching Mad Money and following Cramer's advice are fools." In late January 2007, Henry Blodget – himself indicted for civil securities fraud in 2002 and banned for life from the securities industry – criticized Cramer for overstating his abilities as a market forecaster, noting that in 2006 Cramer's suggested portfolio lost money "despite nearly every major equity market on earth being up between about 15% and 30%". In August 2007, Cramer called for the Federal Reserve to support hedge funds that were losing money in the subprime mortgage crisis, prompting Martin Wolf, the chief economics commentator for the Financial Times, to accuse Cramer of advocating an offensive and catastrophic "socialism for capitalists". In March 2009, during the Jon Stewart–Jim Cramer conflict, Jon Stewart of Comedy Central's The Daily Show questioned CNBC's reporting practices and what should have been done to possibly aid in preventing the economic crisis occurring at the time.

See also
 Fast Money (a CNBC financial investing program, hosted by Melissa Lee, which follows a similar format)
 Kudlow & Cramer
 Money Monster, a 2016 American thriller film
 Squawk on the Street (a CNBC business news program that features Cramer's "Stop Trading!" segment)
 TheStreet.com

References

External links

 
 
 About Mad Money – CNBC.com "Mad Money Manifesto" by Jim Cramer

2005 American television series debuts
2000s American television talk shows
2010s American television talk shows
2020s American television talk shows
2000s American television news shows
2010s American television news shows
2020s American television news shows
Business-related television series
CNBC original programming